Adames  is a surname. It could refer to:
 Carlos Adames (born 1994), Dominican boxer
 Cristhian Adames (born 1991), Dominican baseball infielder
 María Teresa Adames (born 1941), Mexican diver
 Vinicio Adames (1927–1976), Venezuelan musician
 Willy Adames (born 1995), Dominican baseball shortstop

Spanish-language surnames